Thenthiruperai is a panchayat town in Thoothukudi district in the Indian state of Tamil Nadu. It is one of the nine temple shrines that constitutes Nava Tirupathi temples. It is also hosts one of the Navakailasams, Then Thiruperai Sri Kailasanathar Temple,  the seventh in the series.

Demographics
Thenthiruperai is a Town Panchayat city in district of Thoothukkudi, Tamil Nadu. The Thenthiruperai city is divided into 12 wards for which elections are held every 5 years. The Thenthiruperai Town Panchayat has population of 4,934 of which 2,425 are males while 2,509 are females as per report released by Census India 2011.

Population of Children with age of 0-6 is 454 which is 9.20% of total population of Thenthiruperai.In Thenthiruperai Town Panchayat, Female Sex Ratio is of 1035 against state average of 996. Moreover, Child Sex Ratio in Thenthiruperai is around 1018 compared to Tamil Nadu state average of 943. Literacy rate of Thenthiruperai city is 89.49% higher than state average of 80.09%. In Thenthiruperai, Male literacy is around 93.27% while female literacy rate is 85.83%.

Administration
Thenthiruperai Town Panchayat has total administration over 1,276 houses to which it supplies basic amenities like water and sewerage. It is also authorize to build roads within Town Panchayat limits and impose taxes on properties coming under its jurisdiction.

Landmarks

Makara Nedunkuzhaikathar Temple
Makara Nedunkuzhai Kannan Temple, is one of the Nava Tirupathi, nine Hindu temples dedicated to Lord Vishnu located in Tiruchendur-Tirunelveli route, Tamil Nadu, India in the banks of Thamiraparani river.

Sri Kailasanathar Temple, Then Thirupperai
This is the seventh in the Nava Kailasam temples, which is dedicated to the God Budha.  The temple is nearly 500–1000 years old. The primary deity of the temple, Lord Shiva is worshipped as Ponnammai Sametha Kailasanathar or simply Kailasanathar. Mother Goddess Shakti is worshipped as Alakiya Ponnammai. Shrine of Mother Alakiya Ponnammai is located on the right side of Sanctum facing east.

Nandi murti is found facing the main Shivalingam. Here Nandhi with turban is a special feature. Shrines for Vallabha Ganapati, Sakthi Vinayaka, Kannimoola Ganapati, and Sidhivinayaka can be found in the Temple premises. In this temple, a shrine of Kalabhairava with six hands can be found; here Lord is considered to be in the form of Vedas, he doesn't have his usual vehicle dog. The other subsidiary deities worshipped here include Muruga and Navagrahas. Lord Muruga here looks like Sri Shanmuganathar of Thiruchendur with Valli and Devasena. Moon, Guru, Venus on horse chariot, Guru and Venus with eight horses, the Sun with 7 horses and Moon with 10 horses, and this is unique in this temple. This temple is dedicated to the Sri Budhan (Mercury) and is called as Budhan Sthalam. Vilwa is the tree associated with the temple. The Agamam or pooja of this temple is known as Kameeyam.

Thamirabharani River
This river starts from Podhigai mazhalai and ends at the Bay of bengal.

See also 
 P. Sri Acharya

References

Cities and towns in Thoothukudi district